The following is a list of Registered Historic Places in Muskegon County, Michigan.



|}

See also

 List of Michigan State Historic Sites in Muskegon County, Michigan
 List of National Historic Landmarks in Michigan
 National Register of Historic Places listings in Michigan
 Listings in neighboring counties: Kent, Newaygo, Oceana, Ottawa

References

Muskegon County
Muskegon County, Michigan
Buildings and structures in Muskegon County, Michigan